Black Township may refer to:

Black Township, Posey County, Indiana
Black Township, Somerset County, Pennsylvania

See also
 Black Town in India
 Blacktown (disambiguation)
 Blackton (disambiguation)
 Black (disambiguation)